Etaxalus is a genus of longhorn beetles of the subfamily Lamiinae, containing the following species:

 Etaxalus granulipennis Breuning, 1953
 Etaxalus iliacus Pascoe, 1865
 Etaxalus laterialbus Breuning, 1968
 Etaxalus marmoratus Breuning, 1950
 Etaxalus rotundipennis Breuning, 1976

References

Pteropliini